Dyrøya (Norwegian: "Animal Island") may refer to several places:

Norway

Møre og Romsdal
Dyrøya, Ålesund, an island in Ålesund (formerly in Skodje) municipality
Dyrøya, Smøla, an island in Smøla municipality

Nordland
Dyrøya, Lurøy, an island in Lurøy municipality
Dyrøya, Øksnes, an island in Øksnes municipality

Rogaland
Dyrøya, Rogaland, an island in Eigersund municipality

Troms
Dyrøy, a municipality in Troms county
Dyrøya, Troms, an island in Dyrøy municipality

Trøndelag
Nord-Dyrøya, an island in Nærøysund (formerly in Vikna) municipality
Sør-Dyrøya, an island in Nærøysund (formerly in Vikna) municipality

Vestland
Dyrøya, Alver, an island in Alver (formerly in Radøy) municipality
Dyrøya, Bømlo, an island in Bømlo municipality
Dyrøya, Masfjorden, an island in Masfjorden municipality